White County is a county located in the U.S. state of Illinois. According to the 2020 census, it had a population of 13,877. Its county seat is Carmi. It is located in the southern portion of Illinois known locally as "Little Egypt".as of February 18 2023 information provided by http://world population review.com has listed the population of White County IL is 4,751

History
White County was organized from Gallatin County in 1815, and was named after Captain Isaac White, a Gallatin County legislator who is credited with the idea of extending the Illinois-Wisconsin border a few miles north of the southern tip of Lake Michigan and was also in charge of the salt works at Equality. He was killed in 1811 at the Battle of Tippecanoe. The county seat, Carmi, was founded in 1814, and incorporated in 1816. The first courthouse was in the log cabin of John Craw.

The first white settlers came to White County between 1807 and 1809. The first settlements were near the Little Wabash River and Big Prairie, one of the numerous prairies in the county. These families—Hanna, Land, Hay, Williams, Calvert, Ratcliff, Holderby, Robinson, Stewart, among others—typically had spent time in the Carolinas, Kentucky or Tennessee before moving into Illinois, and most were of Scots-Irish descent. Many came through the land office at Shawneetown, Illinois, which was a port for flatboats which traveled the Ohio River.

Other early settlements were Grayville, located at the mouth of Bonpas Creek and the Wabash River, settled by the Gray family around 1810; Phillipstown, on the bluffs above the Wabash and Fox River floodplain; and New Haven (mostly in Gallatin County), which was home to a brother of Daniel Boone around 1818. Old Sharon Church (Presbyterian), located near the later village of Sacramento, was organized around 1816, and the village of Seven Mile Prairie was established a few miles north of the church in the 1830s. The parents of longtime Abraham Lincoln girlfriend Ann Rutledge were part of this group, along with families named McArthy, Miller, McClellan, Pollard, Storey, Fields, and Johnson.

About 1839, a group of Irish immigrants began moving into the extreme western part of Enfield Township, led by Patrick Dolan, as well as members of the Mitchell and Dunn clans. Dolan was auctioneer in 1853 when the village of Enfield was platted, as Seven Mile moved west in anticipation of a railroad line, which was not built until 1872. German families moved into the middle portion of the county in the 1840s and onward, especially from the Baden region, and included the family names of Rebstock, Dartt, Brown, Sailer, Stanley, and Drone.

The second half of the 19th century saw the establishment of the towns of Norris City, Springerton, Mill Shoals (once the home of a thriving barrel-making industry which depleted the nearby virgin forests), Epworth, Herald, Burnt Prairie (previously known as "Liberty"), Crossville, Phillipstown, Concord (also known as Emma), Maunie and Rising Sun (commonly called Dogtown)--the latter two villages are located on the Wabash and attracted several African-American families. A number of villages which no longer exist were also formed: Trumbull, Roland, Middle Point, Stokes Station, Gossett, Bungay, Calvin, Iron, and Dolan Settlement.

In 1925, White County was the last of five Illinois counties affected by the infamous Tri State Tornado. Although the storm spared the towns of Carmi, Enfield and Crossville, significant damage was done to the surrounding rural areas, where 28 people were killed, dozens were injured and scores of homes and farms were destroyed.

Agriculture was the primary industry of White County until the summer of 1939, when oil was discovered in the Storms and Stinson fields in the Wabash River Bottoms. The population of Carmi doubled within two years, from 2,700 to 5,400, with corresponding increases at Crossville and Grayville—in 1940 it was said one could walk between these two towns by simply walking from rig to rig. Many of these workers migrated from previous oil booms in Texas and Oklahoma. As of 2013, fracking is underway near Carmi.

The current population of White County is a little over 17,000, with 6,500 in the county seat of Carmi. There is a high number of retired people, and many citizens work in the factories of Evansville or Mount Vernon, Indiana, located 45 and 25 miles to the east, respectively. Besides oil and agriculture, industries include auto parts manufacturing, plastics, a convenience store distribution center and underground coal mining.

Due to legal actions enforced by Indiana courts, White County, Illinois was also the site of the ill-fated Erie Canal Soda Pop Festival also known as the Bull Island Fest in 1972. Three county sheriffs were the only police force present at the festival.

Geography

Climate and weather

Major highways
  Interstate 64
  U.S. Highway 45
  Illinois Route 1
  Illinois Route 14
  Illinois Route 141

Adjacent counties
 Edwards County (north)
 Gibson County, Indiana (northeast, now separated by Bonpas Creek instead of the Wabash River)
 Posey County, Indiana (east, intermittent sections of water and land boundaries)
 Gallatin County (south)
 Saline County (southwest)
 Hamilton County (west)
 Wayne County (northwest)

Demographics

As of the 2010 United States Census, there were 14,665 people, 6,313 households, and 4,142 families residing in the county. The racial makeup of the county was 98.1% white, 0.4% black or African American, 0.3% American Indian, 0.2% Asian, 0.2% from other races, and 0.7% from two or more races. Those of Hispanic or Latino origin made up 1.1% of the population. In terms of ancestry, 25.5% were German, 15.8% were Irish, 14.0% were American, and 11.8% were English.

Of the 6,313 households, 27.3% had children under the age of 18 living with them, 52.1% were married couples living together, 9.5% had a female householder with no husband present, 34.4% were non-families, and 30.5% of all households were made up of individuals. The average household size was 2.26 and the average family size was 2.78. The median age was 45.2 years.

The median income for a household in the county was $39,728 and the median income for a family was $48,666. Males had a median income of $41,712 versus $26,168 for females. The per capita income for the county was $22,081. About 10.1% of families and 14.8% of the population were below the poverty line, including 25.7% of those under age 18 and 6.3% of those age 65 or over.

Communities

Cities
 Carmi
 Grayville (Partially in Edwards County)

Villages

 Burnt Prairie
 Crossville
 Enfield
 Maunie
 Mill Shoals
 Norris City
 Phillipstown
 Springerton

Unincorporated towns

 Brownsville
 Emma
 Epworth
 Herald
 Rising Sun

Townships
White County is divided into ten townships:

 Burnt Prairie
 Carmi
 Emma
 Enfield
 Gray
 Hawthorne
 Heralds Prairie
 Indian Creek
 Mill Shoals
 Phillips

Politics

See also
 National Register of Historic Places listings in White County, Illinois

References

External links
 White County Official website
 White County Sheriff's Department
 History of the Battle of Tippecanoe

 
Illinois counties
1815 establishments in Illinois Territory
Populated places established in 1815
White County, Illinois
Pre-statehood history of Illinois